Turtle View is a resort village in the Canadian province of Saskatchewan within Census Division No. 17. It is on the shores of Turtle Lake in the Rural Municipality of Parkdale No. 498.

History 
Turtle View incorporated as a resort village on January 1, 2020. It was formed through the amalgamation of the organized hamlets of Indian Point – Golden Sands and Turtle Lake Lodge.

Demographics 
According to Statistics Canada, Turtle View had a population of 193 in 2021.

Government 
The Resort Village of Turtle View is governed by an elected municipal council and an appointed administrator that meets on the third Saturday of every month. The mayor is Troy Johnson and its administrator is Lorrie Bannerman.

See also 
List of communities in Saskatchewan
List of municipalities in Saskatchewan
List of resort villages in Saskatchewan
List of villages in Saskatchewan
List of summer villages in Alberta

References

External links 

Resort villages in Saskatchewan
Parkdale No. 498, Saskatchewan
Division No. 17, Saskatchewan